The Eluru Urban Development Authority (EUDA) is an urban planning agency in West Godavari district of the Indian state of Andhra Pradesh. It was constituted on 1 January 2019, under Andhra Pradesh Metropolitan Region and Urban Development Authority Act, 2016 with the headquarters located at Eluru.

Jurisdiction 
It covers 463 villages in 35 mandals of West Godavari district. The below table lists the urban areas of EUDA.

References 

West Godavari district
Urban development authorities of Andhra Pradesh
State urban development authorities of India